M. potens may refer to:
 Metriorhynchus potens, an extinct Late Jurassic metriorhynchid crocodile species
 Myolepta potens, a hoverfly species

See also
 Potens (disambiguation)